Ndendeule is a Bantu language of Tanzania. Speakers are mostly monolingual.

References

Rufiji-Ruvuma languages
Languages of Tanzania